David F. Clanachan (born 1962) was the commissioner of the Canadian Premier League (CPL) from 2018 to 2022. As Commissioner, Clanachan oversaw all aspects of the league along with the Canadian Soccer Business (CSB). Clanachan is also the Chairman of Restaurant Brands International, Canada. He was named president and chief operating officer of Tim Hortons in 2014, and has more than 35 years with the brand. Clanachan holds a Bachelor of Commerce degree from the University of Windsor.

References

Living people
Canadian Premier League
Sportspeople from Windsor, Ontario
Soccer people from Ontario
1962 births
University of Windsor alumni
Tim Hortons